Louisa Lawson (née Albury) (17 February 1848 – 12 August 1920) was an Australian poet, writer, publisher, suffragist, and feminist. She was the mother of the poet and author Henry Lawson.

Early life

Louisa Albury was born on 17 February 1848 at Guntawang Station near Gulgong, New South Wales, the daughter of Henry Albury and Harriet Winn. She was the second of 12 children in a struggling family, and like many girls at that time left school at 13. On 7 July 1866 aged 18 she married Niels Larsen (Peter Lawson), a Norwegian sailor, at the Methodist parsonage at Mudgee, New South Wales. He was often away gold mining or working with his father-in-law, leaving her on her own to raise four children – Henry 1867, Charles 1869, Peter 1873 and Getrude 1877, the twin of Annette who died at eight months. Louisa grieved over the loss of Annette for many years and left the care of her other children to the oldest child, Henry. This led to ill feelings on Henry's part towards his mother and the two often fought. In 1882 she and her children moved to Sydney, where she managed boarding houses.

Publisher 

Lawson used the money saved while running her boarding houses to purchase shares in the radical pro-federation newspaper The Republican in 1887. She and son Henry edited The Republican in 1887–88, which was printed on an old press in Louisa's cottage. The Republican called for an Australian republic uniting under 'the flag of a Federated Australia, the Great Republic of the Southern Seas'. The Republican was replaced by the Nationalist, but it lasted two issues.

With her earnings and her experience from working on The Republican, Lawson was able in May 1888, to edit and publish The Dawn, Australia's first journal produced solely by women which was distributed throughout Australia and overseas. The Dawn had a strong feminist perspective and frequently addressed issues such as women's right to vote and assume public office, women's education, women's economic and legal rights, domestic violence, and temperance. The Dawn was published monthly for 17 years (1888–1905) and at its height employed 10 female staff. Lawson's son Henry also contributed poems and stories for the paper, and in 1894 The Dawn press printed Henry's first book, Short Stories in Prose and Verse.

Around 1904 Louisa published her own volume, Dert and Do, a simple story of 18,000 words. In 1905 she collected and published her own verses, The Lonely Crossing and other Poems. Louisa likely had a strong influence on her son's literary work in its earliest days.

Suffragist

In 1889 Lawson founded The Dawn Club, which became the hub of the suffrage movement in Sydney. In 1891 the Womanhood Suffrage League of New South Wales formed to campaign for women's suffrage, and Lawson allowed the League to use the Dawn office to print pamphlets and literature free of charge. When women were finally given the vote, in 1902 with the passing of the New South Wales Womanhood Suffrage Bill, Lawson was introduced to the members of Parliament as 'The Mother of Suffrage in New South Wales'.

Later life 
Lawson retired in 1905 but continued to write for Sydney magazines and published The Lonely Crossing and Other Poems, a collection of 53 poems. She died on Thursday 12 August 1920 aged 72 after a long and painful illness in Gladesville Mental Hospital. On Saturday 14 August 1920, she was buried with her parents in the Church of England section of Rookwood Cemetery.

Memorials 

In 1941, The Sydney Morning Herald reported a memorial seat was to be erected in The Domain, Sydney as a tribute to Louisa Lawson.

In 1975 Australia Post released a stamp in honour of Louisa. The Stamp was designed by Des and Jackie O'Brien, and was one in a series of six stamps released on 6 August 1975 to commemorate the International Year of Women. It was printed at the Melbourne Note Printing Branch, using the photogravure process in three colours.

A park in Marrickville, New South Wales is named in her honour. The Louisa Lawson Reserve also contains a large colourful mosaic depicting the front cover of The Dawn, and a plaque that reads "Louisa Lawson (1848–1920) Social Reformer, Writer, Feminist and Mother of Henry Lawson. These stones are all that remain from the walls of her home in Renwick Street, Marrickville."

Louisa Lawson Crescent, in the Canberra suburb of Gilmore, is named in her honour.

Louisa Lawson Building, in the Canberra suburb of Greenway, is named in her honour. This building is currently occupied by Services Australia.

Selected single poems

 "To a Bird" (1888)
 "A Dream" (1891)
 "A Birthday Wish" (1892)
 "To a Bird" (1892)
 "To My Sister" (1893)
 "Lines Written During a Night Spent in a Bush Inn" (1901)
 "The Digger's Daughter" (1903)
 "The Hour is Come" (1903)
 "Back Again" (1904)
 "In Memoriam" (1905)
 "A Child's Question" (1905)
 "A Mother's Answer" (1905)

References

Further reading

State of Victoria. Great Australian Women, Louisa Lawson (1848–1920),
National Library of Australia. Federation Gateway, Lawson, Louisa (1848–1920)
Henry Lawson and Louisa Lawson Online Chronology
Hill of Death – lyrics by Louisa Lawson, music by Joe Dolce, winner of Best Folk Gospel Song, Australian Gospel Song Awards. Lyrics:  Videoclip: 

 [CC-By-SA]
NSW State Archives - Louisa Lawson Suffragist and Businesswoman

External links
 
 
 

1848 births
1920 deaths
Australian suffragists
Australian journalists
Australian feminist writers
People from New South Wales
19th-century Australian writers
19th-century poets
20th-century Australian poets
Australian women poets
Woman's Christian Temperance Union people
19th-century Australian women writers
20th-century Australian women writers
Burials at Rookwood Cemetery